Derogenidae is a family of trematodes belonging to the order Plagiorchiida.

Subdivisions
Derogenidae contains 22 genera arranged in two subfamilies, with one being unassigned.
 Subfamily Derogeninae Nicoll, 1910
 Derogenes Lühe, 1900
 Gonocercella Manter, 1940
 Leurodera Linton, 1910
 Progonus Looss, 1899
 Subfamily Halipeginae Poche, 1926
 Allogenarchopsis Urabe & Shimazu, 2013 
 Allotangiopsis Yamaguti, 1971
 Anguillotrema Chin & Ku, 1974
 Arnola Strand, 1942
 Austrohalipegus Cribb, 1988
 Caudovitellaria Bilqees, Khalid & Talat, 2010
 Chenia Hsu, 1954
 Deropegus McCauley & Pratt, 1961
 Dollfuschella Vercammen-Grandjean, 1960
 Genarchella Travassos, Artigas & Pereira, 1928
 Genarchopsis Ozaki, 1925
 Halipegus Looss, 1899
 Magnibursatus Naidenova, 1969
 Monovitella Ataev, 1970
 Tangenarchopsis Urabe & Nakano, 2018
 Thometrema Amato, 1968
 Vitellotrema Guberlet, 1928
 Derogenoides Nicoll, 1913 (subfamily not assigned)

References

Plagiorchiida